Khoubana District is a district of M'Sila Province, Algeria.

Municipalities
The district is further divided into 3 municipalities:
Khoubana
M'Cif
El Houamed

District of M'Sila Province